Production may refer to:

Economics and business
 Production (economics)
 Production, the act of manufacturing goods
 Production, in the outline of industrial organization, the act of making products (goods and services)
 Production as a statistic, gross domestic product
 Production line

Arts, entertainment, and media

Motion pictures
 Production, film distributor of a company
 Production, phase of filmmaking
 Production, video production

Other uses in arts, entertainment, and media
 Production (album), by Mirwais, 2000
 Production, category of illusory magic trick
 Production, phase of video games development
 Production, Record producer's role
 Production, theatrical performance

Science and technology
 Production, deployment environment where changes go "live" and users interact with it
 Production (computer science), formal-grammar concept
 Primary production, the production of new biomass by autotrophs in ecosystems
 Productivity (ecology), the wider concept of biomass production in ecosystems

See also
 Consumption (economics)
 Means of production
 Producer (disambiguation)
 Product (disambiguation)
 Production rule (disambiguation)
 Production system (disambiguation)